Aleksei Nikolayevich Poddubskiy (born 13 June 1972) is a Russian professional football coach and a former player.

Club career
He made his professional debut in the Soviet Second League in 1988 for FC SKA Khabarovsk.

Coaching career
On 19 October 2020, he resigned as manager of FC SKA-Khabarovsk.

Honours
 Soviet Cup finalist: 1992.
 Russian Cup finalist: 1993 (played in the early stages of the 1992–93 tournament for PFC CSKA Moscow).

References

Soviet footballers
Russian footballers
Association football midfielders
Association football defenders
PFC CSKA Moscow players
Russian Premier League players
FC Okean Nakhodka players
1972 births
Living people
FC SKA-Khabarovsk players
Russian football managers
FC SKA-Khabarovsk managers
Russian Premier League managers